Francis Matthew Buckland (27 August 1854 – 7 March 1913) was an English first-class cricketer active 1874–91 who played for Middlesex and Oxford University. He was born in Laleham-on-Thames and educated at Eton, where he played cricket for the school 1871–73, and University College, Oxford. He became a schoolteacher and taught briefly at Winchester College before becoming headmaster of a preparatory school at Laleham-on-Thames. He died in Bexhill-on-Sea.

References

1854 births
1913 deaths
English cricketers
Middlesex cricketers
Oxford University cricketers
People from Laleham
Marylebone Cricket Club cricketers
People educated at Eton College
Alumni of University College, Oxford
Schoolteachers from Surrey
Old Oxonians cricketers
Gentlemen cricketers